Polished concrete is a multi-step process where a concrete floor is mechanically ground, honed and polished with bonded abrasives in order to cut a concrete floor's surface. It is then refined with each cut in order to achieve a specified level of appearance.

This process also includes the use of a penetrant chemical known as a hardener. The concrete densifier/hardener penetrates into the concrete and creates a chemical reaction to help harden and dust-proof the surface. During concrete polishing, the surface is processed through a series of steps (in general a minimum of four grinding steps of processing is considered polished concrete) utilizing progressively finer grinding tools. The grinding tools are progressive grits of industrial diamonds in a bonded material such as metal/hybrid/resin often referred to as diamond polishing pads.  Polished concrete is a "green" flooring system and LEED approved. Concrete is not considered polished before 1600 grit, and it is normally finished to either the 1600 or 3000+ grit level. Dyes designed for concrete polishing are often applied to add color to polished concrete as well as other options such as scoring, creating radial lines, grids, bands, borders, and other designs. Any grinding under 1600 grit is considered a honed floor.

History 
The oldest known form of polished concrete was discovered in the city of Jericho, in the valley of the River Jordan. According to the Bible, Jericho fell in 1200 BC. Researchers have since discovered several layers of concrete from earlier settlements. Among the layers was a polished concrete floor.

The polished concrete floor was discovered while bulldozing for a new motor speedway.

In 1886 and 1887, the Israeli archaeologist Garfinkle and retired professor Malinowski from Gothenburg in Sweden, who specialized in concrete, took the concrete samples and analyzed them in a laboratory. They determined the concrete originated in 7000 BC.

Malinowski stated that the lower part of the floor consisted of lime concrete with a thickness between 6-8 cm. He also stated the concrete was beige brown and had a very fine polished surface.

1990s 
While polishing marble and granite has been ongoing for several decades, polished concrete in its current form was discovered by accident in the 1990s.

A natural stone polishing contractor, who was starting work on a palace in Tunisia, instructed his new crew to polish a concrete floor. Believing they knew it was to be polished wet as was customary with marble, granite and natural stone, he left them alone. When he arrived several hours later to check on their progress, he realized they were dry polishing and ordered them to stop. Upon further inspection, he had his crew continue polishing dry after he discovered how beautiful the floor was looking.

New or retrofit 
In simple terms, the process of polishing concrete is similar to sanding wood. Heavy-duty polishing machines, for example concrete grinder, are used to gradually grind down surfaces to the desired degree of shine and smoothness.  The closest equivalent example would be polished granite or marble.

Polished concrete floor installation is categorized into two types: new floors, and retrofit floors.

New floors 

New floors require less work resulting in lower costs, but there are a few things to be aware of before a new concrete floor can be polished. Firstly, the mix design of the concrete should be 3500 psi or higher. The concrete should always be poured full depth to take advantage of the concrete's full structural strength, and also help to prevent cracks. The concrete should always be professionally finished with power trowels and properly cured with water for seven days. Polishing should not begin until the concrete is fully cured (generally 28 days). The concrete slab can contain decorative aggregates to create many different aesthetic appearances. The aggregates are mostly sized 20mm, but almost anything can be used. The finished surface of the concrete will need to be finished to a high standard to facilitate the polishing process. According to the Global Concrete Polishing Institute, a FF (floor flatness) level of 50 or greater is desired. During the finishing phase, any decorative aggregates such as seashells, glass chips or even metal car parts can be dropped into the surface of the concrete. Builders must be aware as early as possible if the concrete is to be polished so that the final finish is of the best quality.

Retrofit floors 
Retrofit floors can be done in different ways depending on the conditions of the concrete. If the existing concrete is in good condition the surface can be polished to just about any standard. If the existing floor slab is in poor condition, it can be cut, or ground and the natural aggregate can be featured as the "exposure level". If the existing surface is in very poor condition a topping slab with a minimum thickness of 50 mm (2 inches) can be added on top of the existing slab.

Diamond-polished concrete process 
A diamond polished concrete floor is very time-consuming if done correctly, due to the fact that there are at least six to twelve steps of actual grinding involved. The general rule is to start the initial grinding with a coarse 30/60-grit diamond and finish with a 1600- or 3000+ grit diamond, depending on the exposure level of aggregate and gloss level required. These diamonds are impregnated inside a metal or resin-bonded segment. Typically, the diamonds' grit size will double once the first grind has been carried out. The polishing process begins with a 50-grit diamond resin pad instead of a metal segment. When using the resin pads the steps may be 100, then 200, 400, 800, 1600 and finally 3000+ grit. Throughout the process, a densifier is used to harden the concrete surface, which allows the concrete to be polished. A number of densifiers can be used; these consist of lithium, potassium or sodium silicates. In some cases, a grouting chemical is also used to fill in any holes, cracks or imperfections that were exposed from the initial coarse grinding step. The concrete can be also finished with a natural-look impregnating polish guard, which penetrates 2–5mm inside the pores of the concrete to prevent any deep staining from oils and spills. It is also breathable and not a sealer (as a sealer actually totally seals the concrete and does not allow vapor transmission).

"Hybrid" Concrete Polish
This system is not considered to be real polished concrete, as there is little physical refinement of the concrete slab. However, it does provide a similar look to polished concrete, so may be appropriate in some areas.  Typically, this system is referred to as a "half polish" as generally the surface is only processed through three steps of grinding (half the processing steps of a true polished concrete floor). The surface is densified, so the advantages of the densifier are inherited, then a concrete sealer or a high buildup of a concrete guard is used to create a shine. The "shine" is topical and generally wears easily, requiring high maintenance and reapplication of the material. While there is some level of refinement to the surface, the topical (chemical spray or rolled on) solution will wear off and need to be replaced depending upon the level of floor traffic. Grouting and patching may be required to fill any voids, holes, cracks or imperfections.

Grind-and-seal polished concrete process 
This system is not considered to be polished concrete as there is very little physical refinement of the concrete slab. However, it does provide a similar look to polished concrete and may be appropriate in small spaces with little expected foot traffic or wear on the slab. While there may be some level of surface preparation this is a topical (chemical spray or rolled on) solution and will wear off and need to be replaced depending on floor traffic. Grouting and patching may be required to fill any voids, holes, cracks or imperfections. The surface is then cleaned and prepared for the application of either a gloss or matte surface coating or an impregnating enhancing sealer.

Process 

Process involved in polishing concrete:
The concrete floor is cut with a variety of diamond abrasives of the concrete slab. Polishing can be done wet or dry. However, in the United States, new OSHA regulations on crystalline silica and protecting skilled trades in the concrete, masonry, and brick industries are encouraging the development of wet refinement systems or the use of industrial vacuums.
A densifier can be applied once the concrete is opened up and, in a condition, to readily accept the chemical. The step at which the densifier is applied is determined by hydration of the slab. There are many types of densifiers including, sodium, potassium, lithium, magnesium fluorosilicate and colloidal.
  The densifier is allowed to dry and cure until proper hardness has been achieved, followed by one or more abrasive cuts, which will refine the floor to the desired level of reflectivity.

Distinctness of Image (DOI)

Advantages 

Polished concrete is a form of sustainable design flooring, as it utilizes a material that has already been placed.

Polished concrete floors have the following advantages: 

 low-maintenance – polished concrete is easily maintained with the use of clean water or a neutral pH cleaner. There are also many cleaners designed for the proper maintenance of polished concrete available. There is never a need for wax to be added as it will only dull the finish
 non slippery – due to high coefficient of friction
 dust-proof – minimizing risks dust mite and allergen problems; excludes support of mold growth
 ambient light – highly reflective polished concrete reduces lighting needs and can improve natural lighting

LEED 2009 standards contain guidelines for using polished concrete flooring to qualify for LEED credits.

Disadvantages 
Previously, polished concrete floors were considered to have an extremely long life, but actually, their life depends on the usage.  If the usage is heavy, the polished concrete floor begins to degrade in quality.

Damage and Degradation 
Even though polished concrete doesn't peel off like Epoxy and PU floors, its damage happens in the following phases:

 Development of rough patches on the floor
 Development of very fine hairline cracks on the floor
 Slowly, the rough patches start developing into potholes - which keep getting bigger and deeper with usage
 The hairline cracks form a network on the floor and then ultimately join to result in a damaged floor

See also 
LEED
USGBC
Terrazzo
Concrete sealer

References 

 Top 10 steps involoved in Polished Concrete Process

Concrete
Floors